Mehmet Akpınar (born 3 March 1940) is a Turkish fencer. He competed in the individual sabre event at the 1972 Summer Olympics.

References

External links
 

1940 births
Living people
Turkish male sabre fencers
Olympic fencers of Turkey
Fencers at the 1972 Summer Olympics